Shilykovo is a rural locality (a village) in Mikhaylovskoye Rural Settlement, Kharovsky District, Vologda Oblast, Russia. The population was 8 as of 2002.

Geography 
Shilykovo is located 15 km east of Kharovsk (the district's administrative centre) by road. Alferovskaya is the nearest rural locality.

References 

Rural localities in Kharovsky District